Phymatopleuridae is an extinct family of fossil sea snails, marine gastropod mollusks in the superfamily Pleurotomarioidea (according to the taxonomy of the Gastropoda by Bouchet & Rocroi, 2005).

This family has no subfamilies.

Genera 
Genera within the family Phymatopleuridae include:
 Phymatopleura, the type genus

References

External links 
 Paleobiology Database info